Westfield Woden Plaza (also known as Westfield Woden) is a large shopping centre located in the Woden Town Centre of Phillip of Canberra, Australian Capital Territory. The centre comprises four anchor tenants - David Jones, Big W, Coles and Woolworths - and more than 250 other retail, leisure, and dining outlets.

History
Woden Plaza was initially constructed in stages during the late 1960s and early 1970s, opening as a direct competitor to the Canberra Centre, situated in the City Centre less than 15 minutes away. To begin with, the centre's only components were what now houses the Big W and David Jones areas, but, during the 1980s, expanded to include a medium-sized food court.

In 1996, the Centre underwent a major redevelopment, adding on a new wing to the building called "The Fresh Food Market" (currently housing Coles and Woolworths) as well as a new Hoyts 8-screen cinema complex. It would also see General Property Trust purchase the first, second, and third storeys of the Bonner House building, situated across from the back of the centre, and connect the areas together with a pedestrian bridge.

The centre was once again revitalised during 2018, where a further expansion opened a new dining district on Bradley Street. This project, created as a joint venture with Perron Group, introduced six new eateries in an indoor-outdoor setting, also modernising the facades of Bonner House.

Ownership under The Westfield Group
The Westfield Group purchased a 50% stake in the complex during 2005, with the remaining 50% still belonging to General Property Trust. 
 As of July 2014, this shopping centre is now under Scentre Group management.

References

External links 

 Westfield Woden

Westfield Group
Shopping centres in the Australian Capital Territory
Shopping malls established in 1972
1972 establishments in Australia